The Innovation Center for Artificial Intelligence (ICAI) is a Dutch national network focused on joint technology development between academia, industry and government in the area of artificial intelligence. The initiative was launched in April 2018 and is based at Amsterdam Science Park. Current director of the ICAI is Maarten de Rijke.

In November 2018, ICAI announced its contribution to AINED, the first iteration of the Dutch National AI Strategy.

Labs 
The ICAI network is linked to several collaborative labs:
 Thira Lab (Imaging): Thirona, Delft Imaging Systems and Radboud UMC, founded March 2019
 AIMLab (AI for Medical Imaging): Uva and Inception Institute of Artificial Intelligence from the United Arab Emirates, founded March 2019
 AFL (AI for Fintech): ING and Delft University of Technology, founded March 2019
 Police Lab AI: Dutch National Police, founded January 2019
 Elsevier AI Lab: Uva and Elsevier, founded October 2018
 AIRLab Delft (AI for Retail Robotics): TU Delft Robotics and AholdDelhaize, founded November 2018
 AIRLab Amsterdam (AI for Retail): Uva and AholdDelhaize, founded April 2018
 DeltaLab (Deep Learning Technologies Amsterdam): Uva and Bosch, founded April 2017 (prior to ICAI)
 Quva Lab (Deep Vision): Uva and Qualcomm, founded 2016 (prior to ICAI)

References

External links

Artificial intelligence associations
Organisations based in Amsterdam
2018 establishments in the Netherlands